Gauntlet: The Third Encounter is an arcade-style dungeon crawler developed by Epyx and published by Atari that was released for the Atari Lynx handheld system in 1990. Despite using the same packaging artwork that was used for the NES version, The Third Encounter is not a port of the original Gauntlet or its sequel, but instead is a new game developed specifically for the Lynx.

Gameplay

The player controls an adventurer whose objective is to venture into an ancient castle populated by monsters in order to retrieve the Star Gem. The castle consists of 40 levels. At the start of the game, the player can choose from eight character classes to play as, including the Valkyrie and the Wizard from the original Gauntlet, as well as six new character classes: the Samurai, the Punk Rocker, the Android, the Gunfighter, the Nerd and the Pirate. Up to four players can be play and each class can only be chosen by a single player at a time. It is one of the few games for the Lynx that uses its vertical mode.

Reception

Gauntlet: The Third Encounter garnered mixed reception. In a review for STart, Clayton Walnum commented: "Although The Third Encounter is basically a shoot-em-up, spells and other special items take the game a step beyond that genre. Moreover, tricky obstacles like illusory walls make this dungeon diversion as much a treasure hunt as a shooter. The display is vivid and imaginative and the gameplay fast and smooth".

References

External links
 Gauntlet: The Third Encounter at AtariAge
 Gauntlet: The Third Encounter at GameFAQs
 Gauntlet: The Third Encounter at Giant Bomb
 Gauntlet: The Third Encounter at MobyGames

1990 video games
Atari Lynx games
Atari Lynx-only games
cooperative video games
multiplayer and single-player video games
top-down video games
Video games about valkyries
video games developed in the United States
video games featuring female protagonists
video games scored by Alex Rudis
Epyx games